The Tui oil field is an oil reservoir located  off the west coast of Taranaki, New Zealand. Oil is produced from the Tui, Amokura and Pateke wellheads on the seabed in approximately 120m of water. These wells are connected to the Umuroa, a floating production storage and offloading vessel.

The reservoir was discovered in 2003 by a joint venture between Australian Worldwide Exploration and New Zealand Overseas Petroleum. The nearby Amokura and Pateke oil reserves were discovered in 2004. In 2016, Tamarind purchased AWE's 57.5% interests in the field.

In early 2019, permits were granted for drilling of side track wells to extend the production life of the field. The drilling program was suspended in September 2019 after the first well was dry. Following the suspension of the drilling program, Tamarind warned staff on the Umuroa that its contract would not be renewed after December 31.

On 11 November 2019 field operator Tamarind Taranaki announced that it "may be insolvent" and put the company into administration.

On 27 November Tamarind was served with an abatement notice by the Environmental Protection Authority following a small oil spill at the Tui site. In 2020 the High Court ordered the Umuroa FPSO to stay connected to the oilfield and was cited by Greenpeace as a reason to urgently update the regulatory regime for oil and gas.

See also 
 Energy in New Zealand
 Oil and gas industry in New Zealand

References 

Zealandia
Geography of Taranaki
Geography of the New Zealand seabed
Oil fields of New Zealand